Relacorilant (developmental code name CORT-125134) is an antiglucocorticoid which is under development by Corcept Therapeutics for the treatment of Cushing's syndrome. It is also under development for the treatment of solid tumors and alcoholism. The drug is a nonsteroidal compound and acts as an antagonist of the glucocorticoid receptor. As of December 2017, it is in phase II clinical trials for Cushing's syndrome and phase I/II clinical studies for solid tumors, while the clinical phase for alcoholism is unknown.

References

External links
 Relacorilant - AdisInsight

Antiglucocorticoids
Experimental drugs
Fluoroarenes
Isoquinolines
Ketones
Pyrazoles
Pyridines
Sulfonamides
Trifluoromethyl compounds